John Cheetham may refer to:
John Cheetham (composer), American composer
John Cheetham (cricketer), cricket player 
John Cheetham (manufacturer), English cotton manufacturer